Radnor is a hamlet near Redruth in Cornwall, England. Radnor is northeast of Redruth and close to the A30 main road.

References

Hamlets in Cornwall